August Vacation (also known as Summer Holidays) is a 1995 Italian comedy-drama film directed by Paolo Virzì.

The film was awarded with the David di Donatello for Best Film.

Plot

Cast 
Silvio Orlando: Sandro Molino
Laura Morante: Cecilia Sarcoli
Ennio Fantastichini: Ruggero Mazzalupi
Paola Tiziana Cruciani: Luciana 
Sabrina Ferilli: Marisa
Piero Natoli: Marcello 
Agnese Claisse: Martina 
Rocco Papaleo: Brigadiere
Silvio Vannucci: Mauro Santucci
Antonella Ponziani: Francesca
Teresa Saponangelo: Irene Vitiello 
Gigio Alberti: Roberto

See also
 List of Italian films of 1995

References

External links

1995 films
Films directed by Paolo Virzì
Italian comedy-drama films
1995 comedy-drama films
Commedia all'italiana
Films set on islands
1990s Italian-language films
1990s Italian films